Hadden is the place name of:
 Hadden, Roxburghshire, Scotland

Hadden is the surname of:

Al Hadden (1899–1969), American professional football player
Alf Hadden (1877–1936), Australian cricketer
Briton Hadden (1898–1929), co-founder of Time magazine with Henry Luce and its first editor
Charles Hadden (1854–1924), British Army major-general and Master-General of the Ordnance
Dianne Hadden (born 1951), Australian politician
Frank Hadden (born 1954), Scottish rugby union coach
H. G. Hadden (1874–1945), American college football player and coach
James Cuthbert Hadden (1861–1914), Scottish author, journalist, biographer and organist
James Murray Hadden (died 1817) British Army office and Master General of the Ordnance
Jeffrey K. Hadden (1937–2003), American professor of sociology
Martin Hadden (born c. 1970), British chef who won a Michelin star at two restaurants
Matty Hadden (born 1990), rugby league player from Northern Ireland
Peter Hadden (1950–2010), leading member of the Socialist Party in Northern Ireland
Sally Hadden, American historian
Sid Hadden (1877–1934), English cricketer
Susan Hadden (1945–1995), American political scientist and professor
Thomas Hadden (1871–1940), Scottish maker of ornamental ironwork
Tommy Hadden (1840–1881), American saloon keeper, criminal and underworld figure in New York City
Whitney Hadden (born 1949), known by his stage name, Whit Haydn or "Pop Haydn", magician and stage performer
William J. Hadden (1921–1995), Protestant minister, local politician and civil rights advocate
William L. Hadden (1896–1983), American politician, 67th Lieutenant Governor of Connecticut from 1943 to 1945
Hadden (Hampshire cricketer), amateur English cricketer, full name unknown

See also
Hadden Clark (born 1952), American murderer
Arter & Hadden LLP, a Cleveland, Ohio-based law firm that traced its founding to 1843 and ceased operations in 2003
Hadden-Margolis House, historic home located at Harrison, Westchester County, New York
Ruth Hadden Memorial Award, award for the best first novel published in Britain
Hadden Industries, a company in the 1997 science-fiction movie Contact
Haddon (disambiguation)